Vitamins occur in a variety of related forms known as vitamers. A vitamer of a particular vitamin is one of several related compounds that performs the functions of said vitamin and prevents the symptoms of deficiency of said vitamin.

Early research identified vitamins by their ability to cure vitamin-specific deficiency diseases. For example, vitamin B1 was first identified as a substance that prevented and treated beriberi. Subsequent nutrition research has revealed all vitamers exhibit biological activity against their specific vitamin deficiency, although different vitamers exhibit different potencies against those diseases.

A set of vitamers with related biological activity are grouped together by a general name, or generic descriptor, that refers to similar compounds with the same vitamin function. For example, vitamin A is the generic descriptor for the class of vitamin A vitamers which include retinol, retinal, retinoic acid, and provitamin carotenoids such as beta-carotene among others.

Properties 
Vitamers often have subtly different properties from their primary, or most common form. These differences include abundance in the typical diet, bioavailability, toxicity, physiological activities, and metabolism. Some vitamers are associated with different benefits for health compared to other forms of the same vitamin.

Folic acid, a vitamer of vitamin B9 commonly added to fortified foods and dietary supplements, is 1.7 times more bioavailable than vitamers of vitamin B9 found in minimally processed foods. Differences in digestion and absorption account for the notable differences in bioavailability between vitamers of vitamin B9. Forms of vitamin B9 that occur in minimally processed foods, sometimes referred to as "food folates", require digestion by enzymatic hydrolysis prior to absorption whereas folic acid does not.  

Some vitamins have toxic effects when consumed in excess amounts and certain vitamers have a greater potential for toxicity compared to other forms of the same vitamin. For example, hypervitaminosis A is a toxicity syndrome caused by excess consumption of retinoid vitamers of vitamin A such as retinol, retinal, and retinoic acid. In contrast, provitamin A carotenoids such as beta-carotene are not associated with these toxic effects.

Nicotinic acid and nicotinamide are two vitamers of vitamin B3 that exhibit differences in metabolism. Large, pharmaceutical doses of the nicotinic acid are used under medical supervision as a treatment for hypercholesterolemia. High doses of nicotinic acid are also associated with a potential for adverse effects, most commonly a niacin flush reaction that is characterized by redness or flushing of the skin, sensations of heat, itching, and tingling. The nicotinamide vitamer of vitamin B3 does not exhibit the same therapeutic effect for treatment of hypercholesterolemia, but also does not cause a niacin flush reaction and is not associated with the same adverse effects as nicotinic acid.

Foods and dietary supplements 
As part of an overall diet, minimally processed foods provide a number of different naturally occurring vitamers. This is frequently in contrast to fortified foods and dietary supplements which generally provide vitamins as a single vitamer. Vitamin E, vitamin B6, and vitamin B9 are three examples.

Vitamin E 
Naturally occurring vitamers of vitamin E include tocopherols (α-,  β-, γ-, and δ-) and tocotrienols ( α-, β-, γ-, and δ-). Many plant-based foods provide all eight naturally occurring vitamers of vitamin E in varying amounts from different sources. Tocopherols are more abundant in commonly consumed foods relative to tocotrienols. Fortified foods and dietary supplements predominantly contain vitamin E as α-tocopherol salts, most frequently as tocopheryl acetate or vitamin E acetate.

The different naturally occurring vitamers of vitamin E are not interconverted in the body and have different metabolic effects. Newly absorbed vitamers of vitamin E are transported to the liver. The liver recognizes and preferentially re-secretes α-tocopherol into circulation, making it the most abundant vitamer of vitamin E in the blood. While tocotrienols are present in lower concentrations, they have more potent antioxidant properties than α-tocopherol and can have metabolic impacts at low concentration. Normal serum concentrations of α-tocopherol in adults ranges from 5 to 20 μg/mL.

Vitamin B6 
There are at least six naturally occurring vitamers of vitamin B6 including pyridoxine, pyridoxal, and pyridoxamine as well as a 5'-phosphate derivative of each. All six naturally occurring vitamers of vitamin B6 are found in foods.

Pyridoxine, along with its phosphorylated form, pyridoxine-5'-phosphate, are primarily found in plant-based foods. Pyridoxine is the most stable vitamer of vitamin B6. Pyridoxine glucoside is a related vitamer that is also found in some plant-based foods. Pyridoxal-5'-phosphate and pyridoxamine-5'-phosphate are vitamers predominantly found in animal-based foods.

Fortified foods and dietary supplements commonly provide vitamin B6 as pyridoxine hydrochloride.

Vitamin B9 (Folate) 
There are many naturally occurring vitamers of vitamin B9, i.e., folate, found in minimally processed foods. Sometimes referred to as "food folates", these vitamers are characterized as pteroylpolyglutamates and contain between one and six additional glutamate molecules compared to folic acid. Folic acid, chemically described as pteroylmonoglutamic acid, is another vitamer of vitamin B9. Though rarely found in minimally processed foods, it is the primary form of vitamin B9 added to fortified foods and many dietary supplements.

Folic acid and food folates are absorbed and metabolized by different pathways. After digestion, food folates are converted in the small intestine to 5-methltetrahydrofolic acid, a biologically active vitamer of vitamin B9. Folic acid is absorbed and transported in the bloodstream to the liver, where it is converted to tetrahydrofolate, a second biologically active vitamer, by dihydrofolate reductase. The liver has a limited capacity to metabolize folic acid into tetrahydrofolate. Any folic acid that is not converted to tetrahydrofolate in the liver remains in the blood until it is either metabolized in the liver or excreted by the kidney. Folic acid that remains in the blood stream is considered unmetabolized folic acid. Since the introduction of mandatory folic acid fortification in the US, most people have a variable amount of unmetabolized folic acid circulating in their blood.

List of vitamins with some of their active forms

See also 
 Isomer
 Provitamin

References

External links 
 Dictionary definition of vitamer. Referenced Jan. 4, 2008

Nutrients
Dietary supplements